Ding Guoyu (June 1916 – May 11, 2015) was a Chinese diplomat.

Early life 
Ding was born in Jinzhai County, Anhui.

Career 
In 1955, Ding started his foreign service career as a Chinese diplomat.
Ding was Ambassador of the People's Republic of China to Afghanistan (1955–1958), Pakistan (1960–1966) and Egypt (1982–1984).

References

External links 

1916 births
2015 deaths
Ambassadors of China to Afghanistan
Ambassadors of China to Pakistan
Ambassadors of China to Egypt
Members of the 7th Chinese People's Political Consultative Conference
People's Republic of China politicians from Anhui
Politicians from Lu'an